Fellowship of the Royal Society of Biology (FRSB), previously Fellowship of the Society of Biology (FSB), is an award and fellowship granted to individuals that the Royal Society of Biology has adjudged to have made a "prominent contribution to the advancement of the biological sciences, and has gained no less than five years of experience in a position of senior responsibility".

Fellowship
Fellows are entitled to use the post-nominal letters FRSB.  examples of fellows include David Attenborough, Martin Hume Johnson, Jasmin Fisher and Nancy Rothwell. See the :Category: Fellows of the Royal Society of Biology for more examples.

References

Royal Society of Biology
Academic awards